Polycopidae is a family of marine ostracods. Its members are related to animals in the suborder Halocypridina, but are sufficiently distinct to be placed in the sub-order Cladocopina. There is even some speculation that a separate order may be warranted. The genera in the family differ from the other suborder, Halocypridina, in several features: the central adductor muscle scars are in a triangular (3 scars) or half-rosette (15 scars) pattern, they lack sixth and seventh limbs, and the maxilla (=fourth limb) has both an exopod and endopod (the maxilla in the Halocypridina lacks an exopod).

The following genera are included:

Archypolycope Chavtur, 1981
Axelheibergella Briggs, 1997
†Discoidella Croneis & Gale, 1939
Eupolycope Chavtur, 1981
Hexopolycope Chavtur, 1981
Hyphalocope I. Karanovic & Brandão, 2012
Kliecope Tanaka, Tsukagoshi & Karanovic, 2014
Metapolycope Kornicker & van Morkhoven, 1976
Micropolycope Chavtur, 1981
†Nodopolycope Kozur, 1985
Orthopolycope Chavtur, 1981
Parapolycope Klie, 1936
Parapolycopissa Chavtur, 1981
Permopolycope Kozur, 1985
Polycope G. O. Sars, 1866
Polycopetta Chavtur, 1981
Polycopiella Chavtur, 1981
Polycopinna Chavtur, 1981
Polycopinoidea Hu & Tao, 2008
Polycopissa Chavtur, 1981
Polycopsis G. W. Mueller, 1894
Pontopolycope Chavtur, 1981
Pseudopolycope Chavtur, 1981

References

External links

Ostracod families
Halocyprida